Margarida Carmo (born 20 April 1969) is a Portuguese rhythmic gymnast.

Carmo competed for Portugal in the rhythmic gymnastics individual all-around competition at the 1984 Summer Olympics in Los Angeles. There she was 16th in the preliminary (qualification) round and advanced to the final of 20 competitors. In the end she finished in the 18th place overall.

References

External links 
 
 

1969 births
Living people
Portuguese rhythmic gymnasts
Gymnasts at the 1984 Summer Olympics
Olympic gymnasts of Portugal